The 2004 Millennium International Tennis Championships was an ATP tournament held in Delray Beach, Florida, United States that was part of the International Series of the 2004 ATP Tour. It was the 12th editions of the tournament and was held from September 13 to September 20. Unseeded Ricardo Mello won the singles title.

Finals

Singles

 Ricardo Mello defeated  Vincent Spadea 7–6(7–2), 6–3
 It was Mello's only singles title of the year and of his career.

Doubles

 Leander Paes /  Radek Štěpánek defeated  Gastón Etlis /  Martín Rodríguez 6–0, 6–3
 It was Paes's 4th title of the year and the 33rd of his career. It was Štěpánek's 3rd title of the year and the 9th of his career.

References

External links
 ITF tournament edition details

Millennium International Tennis Championships
Delray Beach Open
Millennium International Tennis Championships
Millennium International Tennis Championships
Millennium International Tennis Championships
2004 Millennium International Tennis Championships